Oxathridia roraimae is a species of beetle in the family Cerambycidae, the only species in the genus Oxathridia.

References

Acanthocinini